Frank Hainsworth Wade (1 September 1871 – 4 October 1940) was an Australian cricketer. He played 5 first-class cricket matches for New South Wales between 1895 and 1896, scoring 145 runs and taking two wickets.

See also
 List of New South Wales representative cricketers

References

External links
 

1871 births
1940 deaths
Australian cricketers
New South Wales cricketers
Sportsmen from New South Wales